Camp Morton Provincial Park is a provincial park located on the west shore of Lake Winnipeg in Manitoba, Canada, about  north of Gimli. It was designated as a provincial park in 1974.

The park is located in the Gimli eco-district within the Interlake Plain eco-region. This eco-region is part of the Boreal Plains eco-zone.

The Gimli Cross Country Ski Club maintains several kilometres of trail within the park for cross-country skiing in the winter.

See also
List of protected areas of Manitoba
List of provincial parks in Manitoba

External links

Camp Morton Provincial Park
iNaturalist: Camp Morton Provincial Park

References

Provincial parks of Manitoba
Gimli, Manitoba
Protected areas of Manitoba